Tomáš Janů (born 17 September 1973 in Příbram) is a former Czech footballer. He was able to play either left back or left defensive midfielder. Janů was the longest serving player in the club of FC Slovan Liberec (over 350 starts). He was also the team captain. In summer of 2010 he moved to FK Ústí nad Labem on loan.

He ended professional career on 1 June 2013 in FC Slovan Liberec together with his teammate Zbyněk Hauzr.

Honours

Club
 Slovan Liberec
Czech Cup: 1999–2000
Gambrinus liga: 2001–02, 2005–06, 2011–12

References

External links 
 Club Profile 
 
 

1973 births
Living people
Czech footballers
Czech First League players
FC Slovan Liberec players
Association football defenders
1. FK Příbram players
FK Ústí nad Labem players
Sportspeople from Příbram